Yellow Pictures (椰楼映画) is an international film & TV production company led by founder-cum-director Wong Kew-Lit, co-founder-cum-senior producer Chan Shiau-Wei, and co-founder-cum-chief editor Wee Pei-Jun, and supporting by a team of enthusiastic young people. Its major strength has been seen in their documentaries and films with strong and distinctive local cultural touch. It also has a reputation in making in-depth documentaries & films which tend to lead viewers into deep retrospection. Rooted and grown on the land of Malaysia, the company’s vision is to bring Malaysia & South-East-Asia to the world.

Productions
My Roots《扎根》(2007)
Malaysian Movers《风云人物》(2007)
My Malaysia《活在我乡》(2008)
Dynamic Malaysia《前进吧•马来西亚》(2008)
Living in Malaysia《身在马来西亚》(2008)
Earnest Cultivation Yields Fruitful Harvests《生更致富》(2009)
My New Village Stories《我来自新村》(2009)
Malaysia My Home - Story of Sabah & Sarawak《家在马来西亚-沙巴与砂拉越华人故事》(2009)
Parents' Stories《父母心》(2010)
Stories of SJKC《我来自华小》(2010)
My New Village Stories 2《我来自新村2》(2010)
Made in Malaysia《老字号》(2011)
Parents' Stories 2《父母心2》(2011)
Stories of SJKC 2《我来自华小2》(2011)
Malaysia My Home - Story of Sabah & Sarawak 2《家在马来西亚-沙巴与砂拉越华人故事2》(2011)
The Traditional Trades《老行业》(2012)
Behind The Dialect Groups《话说籍贯》(2012)
Old	Street Of Malaysia《老街故事》(2012)
Strong Life《生命的战士》(2013)
Malaysia My Home 5 - Story of West Malaysia《家在马来西亚5-西马城镇华人故事》(2013)
A Century of Chinese Education《马来西亚百年华教》(2013)
My New Village Stories 3《我来自新村3》(2013)
Century Tales《百年》(2013)
Stories of SJKC 3《我来自华小3》(2013)
Our Land《大地》(2014)
The Master《师傅》(2014)
Between Us《我们》(2014)
Good Morning Teacher《老师，您好》(2015)
Our Land 2《大地2》(2015)
Memoirs of World War II《三年零八个月》(2015)
The Successor《接班人》(2015)
The Moments《光辉岁月》(2016)
A Love of Many Colors《白头偕老》(2016)
Made in Malaysia 2《老字号2》(2016)
Malaysia Railway Memories《铁道·人生》(2016)
To Live《活着》(2016)
Malaysia River Towns《母亲河》(2016)
Whose Tradition《谁的传统》(2017)
Work Abroad《别叫我马劳》(2017)
Sixty《一甲子》(2017)

Achievements
 Malaysia My Home - Story of Sabah & Sarawak - Best TV Documentary (Anugerah Seri Angkasa, 2010)
 My Roots - Best Documentary Director (Anugerah Oskar Malaysia Ke-6, 2007)

See also
 Astro AEC
 Astro Wah Lai Toi

References

External links
 The Moments Astro Official Website
 Yellow Pictures Official Website

Film production companies of Malaysia
Television production companies of Malaysia
Privately held companies of Malaysia